The Banshees of Inisherin is a 2022 black tragicomedy film directed, written, and produced by Martin McDonagh. Set on a remote, fictional island off the west coast of Ireland, the film stars Colin Farrell and Brendan Gleeson as two lifelong friends who find themselves at an impasse when one abruptly ends their relationship, with alarming consequences for both of them. Kerry Condon and Barry Keoghan also star. It reunites Farrell and Gleeson, who previously worked together on McDonagh's directorial debut, In Bruges (2008).

The film had its world premiere at the 79th Venice International Film Festival on 5 September 2022, where Farrell won the Volpi Cup for Best Actor and McDonagh won the Golden Osella for Best Screenplay. It was theatrically released in Ireland, the United Kingdom, and the United States on 21 October 2022 by Searchlight Pictures. The film received critical acclaim, with particular praise towards McDonagh's direction and screenplay, the performances of the cast, and Carter Burwell's score. It has grossed $47.5 million worldwide against a $20 million budget.

The Banshees of Inisherin received nine nominations at the 95th Academy Awards, including Best Picture, Best Director, Best Actor (Farrell), Best Supporting Actor (Gleeson and Keoghan), Best Supporting Actress (Condon), and Best Original Screenplay. At the 80th Golden Globe Awards, it achieved three wins from eight nominations: Best Motion Picture – Musical or Comedy, Best Actor – Musical or Comedy (Farrell), and Best Screenplay. Additionally, at the 29th Screen Actors Guild Awards, the film received five nominations, alongside Everything Everywhere All at Once (2022), tying the record for the most nominations, previously set by Shakespeare in Love (1998), Chicago (2002) and Doubt (2008). It also won four BAFTA Awards from ten nominations: Outstanding British Film, Best Actor in a Supporting Role (Keoghan), Best Actress in a Supporting Role (Condon), and Best Original Screenplay. The film was also named one of the Top Ten Films of 2022 by the National Board of Review.

Plot
At the tail end of the Irish Civil War in 1923, on the fictional Irish isle of Inisherin (whose name literally translates as "the island of Ireland"), folk musician Colm Doherty abruptly begins ignoring his lifelong best friend and drinking buddy Pádraic Súilleabháin. Pádraic, though "nice" and respected by the islanders, is too dull for Colm, who wishes to spend the remainder of his life composing music and doing things for which he will be remembered. Pádraic's life is ruined by the loss of his friend; as Pádraic grows increasingly stressed by the rejection, Colm becomes more resistant to his old friend's attempts to make amends. Colm eventually gives Pádraic an ultimatum: every time Pádraic approaches him or tries to talk with him, Colm will cut off one of his own left fingers with a pair of sheep shears.

The local Garda, Peadar, beats his troubled son Dominic severely, and Pádraic and his sister Siobhán take Dominic in for a short time. While delivering milk to the market, Peadar insults Pádraic, who retaliates by making public the fact that he abuses his son. Peadar punches him to the ground. Having witnessed this, Colm puts Pádraic back in his wagon and drives him home; the two do not speak.

Though Siobhán and Dominic attempt to defuse the pair's feud, their efforts prove useless. Pádraic drunkenly confronts Colm in the pub over his lack of "niceness", also chastising Peadar over the fact that he molests Dominic. Colm remarks that this is the most interesting Pádraic has been, and mutters: "I think I like him again now." The next morning, not remembering what he has said, Pádraic attempts to apologise to Colm but the conversation goes badly and Colm responds by cutting off his left index finger and throwing it at Pádraic's door.

After Pádraic sees Colm meeting with a fiddler from the mainland, Pádraic tricks the fiddler into returning home by lying about his father being hit by a bread van. As the tensions worsen, local elder Mrs. McCormick warns Pádraic that death will come to the island soon. Meanwhile, Siobhán sympathetically rejects Dominic's romantic advances.

Pádraic tells Dominic about what he did to the fiddler, and Dominic expresses his disappointment in Pádraic's behaviour. Pádraic becomes convinced that this will make him interesting enough for Colm, and he visits Colm to confront him for being cold towards him. Colm reveals that he has finished composing his song, which he calls "The Banshees of Inisherin". The two appear to be on the point of reconciling when, before leaving for the pub, Pádraic mentions that he lied to the fiddler to get him off the island. Instead of meeting Pádraic at the pub, Colm cuts off all four of his remaining left fingers and throws them at Padraic's door.

Bored of life on the island, and disgusted by Pádraic and Colm's feud, Siobhán moves to the mainland for a job in a library. Pádraic comes home to find his pet donkey Jenny has choked on one of Colm's fingers and died. He tracks down Colm and tells him he will burn his house down the next day at 2:00 p.m., regardless of whether Colm is in it. The next day Pádraic sets fire to Colm's house as promised, but not before taking Colm's dog Sammy, who is outside the house, with him. Pádraic looks in a window and sees Colm calmly sitting inside the burning building. Peadar goes to Pádraic's house, planning to arrest him. He is led away by Mrs. McCormick, who takes him to Dominic's corpse floating in the nearby lake.

The next morning, Pádraic, with Sammy, finds Colm standing on the beach beside his burnt-out house. Colm apologises for the donkey's death and suggests destroying the house has ended their war, but Pádraic informs him that it only would have ended if he had stayed inside the house. When Colm wonders if the Civil War has ended, Pádraic replies that he believes it may be a good thing that there are some things that cannot be moved on from. As Pádraic turns to leave, Colm thanks him for looking after Sammy; "Any time", Pádraic responds. Unbeknownst to them, Mrs. McCormick is observing them from a distance by Colm's burned cottage.

Cast

 Colin Farrell as Pádraic Súilleabháin
 Brendan Gleeson as Colm Doherty
 Kerry Condon as Siobhán Súilleabháin
 Barry Keoghan as Dominic Kearney
 Gary Lydon as Garda Peadar Kearney
 Pat Shortt as publican Jonjo Devine
 Sheila Flitton as Mrs. McCormick
 Bríd Ní Neachtain as postmistress Mrs. O'Riordan
 Jon Kenny as Gerry
 Aaron Monaghan as Declan
 David Pearse as priest
 Lasairfhíona Ní Chonaola as female singer
 John Carty as older musician 1

Production
In February 2020, Martin McDonagh was reported to have set his next directorial effort up with Searchlight Pictures, and it would see him reunite with his In Bruges stars Colin Farrell and Brendan Gleeson. In August 2021, Kerry Condon and Barry Keoghan were added to the cast.

Principal photography began in August 2021 on Inishmore (Inis Mór) before moving to Achill Island, County Mayo, later that month. Locations used on Achill include Cloughmore (JJ Devine's Pub), Corrymore Lake (Mrs. McCormick's cottage), Keem Bay (Colm Doherty's house), Purteen Harbour (O'Riordan's shop), and St. Thomas's Church in Dugort. Filming wrapped on 23 October 2021.

Costume designer Eimer Ní Mhaoldomhnaigh discussed the painstaking lengths she and her team took to make the wardrobe not feel like "a pastiche of the Aran Islands", which included using cloth that was entirely homespun and only using Irish wools, linens and overdyed fabrics. For Pádraic's red jumper, Ní Mhaoldomhnaigh envisioned what his sister Siobhán would have genuinely been motivated to make for him. "I can imagine Siobhán thinking, 'Oh my God, the winter's going to be very cold. I'm going to knit him a jumper,' then making the little collar as a kind of personal touch... there's a beautiful naiveté to the way he dresses, but it's very tender as well, that idea that she adds this little touch to it. I think it says so much about him and his relationship with Siobhán, and his relationship with where he lives and his Irishness," Ní Mhaoldomhnaigh explained.

For Colm, Ní Mhaoldomhnaigh said: "There had to be something of the poet in the way he dressed, but without it being very ostentatious. So, he wears some corduroy that's nicely dyed and a saffron-colored linen shirt. There's that element of, not vanity, but a knowingness of somebody who has traveled to the outside world at some point and brought back ideas of what a poet or a musician should look like."

Music

The original score is composed by Carter Burwell, McDonagh's frequent collaborator. McDonagh did not want Burwell to compose an "Irish-based" score despite the film's setting. For Pádraic's character, Burwell approached a "child-like" and "Disney character" based score, and also used fiddle-themed compositions for Colm. The film's soundtrack was digitally released by Hollywood Records on 21 October 2022 along with the film.

The film features some traditional pub session scenes with Irish music, in which traditional musicians join Gleeson, who plays the fiddle. These fellow musicians consist of his son James Carty (fiddle), John Carty (fiddle), Conor Connolly (accordion), Oliver Farrelly (accordion), and Ryan Owens (bodhrán). In one pub scene, Lasairfhíona Ní Chonaola sings the Irish song "I'm a Man You Don't Meet Every Day".

It also features an opening scene set to the traditional Bulgarian folk song 'Polegnala e Todora', arranged by Filip Kutev and performed by the Bulgarian State Television Female Vocal Choir.

Release

The Banshees of Inisherin had its world premiere at the 79th Venice International Film Festival on 5 September 2022 where it received a 15-minute standing ovation from the audience, the longest of that year's festival. It also screened at the Toronto International Film Festival that same month and was screened as the opening night film of the 31st Philadelphia Film Festival on 19 October 2022. The film was theatrically released on 21 October 2022.

The film was released on rental PVOD and made available to stream on HBO Max on 13 December 2022, and was released on Blu-ray and DVD on 20 December 2022 by 20th Century Home Entertainment and Disney / Buena Vista. Bonus features include the featurette "Creating The Banshees of Inisherin" and deleted scenes.

The Banshees of Inisherin was released on Disney+ as part of the Star content hub in selected regions on 14 December 2022, and 21 December 2022 in the United Kingdom and Ireland. The film was also released on Disney+ Hotstar in India on 14 December 2022.

The film returned to cinemas in the United States on 27 January 2023 to celebrate its Academy Award nominations.

Reception

Box office
, The Banshees of Inisherin has grossed $10.6 million in the United States and Canada, and $36.9 million in other territories, for a worldwide total of $47.5 million.

In the film's opening weekend in the U.S. it made $184,454 from four theaters, for a per-venue average of $46,113, making it the second-highest grossing opener for a Fall 2022 platform release, behind Till. The following weekend the film expanded to 58 theaters, making $535,170. The following weekend it expanded to 895 theaters, making $2.1 million and finishing seventh at the box office. These results were attributed to the increasing change in audience behavior towards prestige films in a moviegoing environment altered by the COVID-19 pandemic, where moviegoers would refuse to see and support these particular titles in favor of franchise and straight-forward horror films. Upon its return to theaters during the weekend of 27 January 2023, following the Academy Award nomination announcements, it rose 383% domestically.

Critical response

 

Peter Bradshaw from The Guardian gave the film four out of five stars writing that "as a study of male loneliness and swallowed anger it is weirdly compelling and often very funny". Todd McCarthy from Deadline Hollywood wrote that the film was "a simple and diabolical tale of a friendship's end shot through with bristling humor and sudden moments of startling violence". He also praised Ben Davis' cinematography and Carter Burwell's score. David Ehrlich from IndieWire rated it B+, writing that "its constant undercurrent of humor affords the story's most pressing questions an appropriately ridiculous context, one that speaks to the absurdities of all existence". He also called it McDonagh's best work since In Bruges.

Matthew Creith from Screen Rant noted the film's "demonstration of the metaphorical aspects of civil disobedience and internal protest between a set of individuals is remarkably hilarious". The New York Times Kyle Buchanan wrote: "The film was rapturously received here in Venice, earning a lengthy standing ovation and rave reviews." In a review for Variety, Guy Lodge wrote: "What begins as a doleful, anecdotal narrative becomes something closer to mythic in its rage and resonance: McDonagh has long fixated on the most visceral, vengeful extremes of human behavior, but never has he formed something this sorely heartbroken from that fascination."

David Rooney from The Hollywood Reporter called the film "a ruminative ensemble piece that expertly balances the tragicomic with the macabre, inhabiting territory adjacent to McDonagh's stage work yet also sweepingly cinematic". Robbie Collin of The Telegraph awarded it 5/5 stars and described it as "an often shoulder-shudderingly funny film, whose comic dialogue is dazzlingly designed and performed".

Conversely, Mark Feeney, writing for The Boston Globe, gave an unenthusiastic review, describing it as "a short story trying to be a novel" and calling the metaphor for the Irish Civil War "awfully flat-footed". Several critics took issue with the film's portrayal of Ireland. Mark O'Connell from Slate criticized the characters in the film for what he considered their portrayal of "Irishness", and noted that this aspect of the film might pass non-Irish critics, writing that "it's worth noting, though maybe not surprising, that international critics have failed to take issue with its deployment of the hoariest Irish stereotypes". Ed Power of The Telegraph considered that "underneath its Quiet Man curlicues, a much better movie strains for freedom" and was disappointed that McDonagh chose to "shroud his character study in hackneyed Paddy-isms". The Spectators Joy Porter attacked the "insidious falsehood perpetuated by this film about [her] home country's history of partition and civil war", summarising it as a "beautifully staged but dangerously ahistorical and misleading film". John Waters, however, praised the film in his review for First Things for "[taking] the kitschified, cliched landscape of Ireland and [handing] it back to itself, cleansed". "Most Irish writers and artists simply run away from the tainted iconography, but McDonagh cleans it off and kisses it, redeeming it with a new meaning in which the irony is both present and transcended," he continued.

The film appeared on a number of critics' lists of the best films of 2022, appearing at first place on several.

Accolades

References

External links

 
 Official screenplay
 

2020s English-language films
2022 black comedy films
2022 comedy-drama films
American black comedy films
American comedy-drama films
BAFTA winners (films)
Best British Film BAFTA Award winners
Best Musical or Comedy Picture Golden Globe winners
British black comedy films
British comedy-drama films
Film4 Productions films
Films about donkeys
Films about friendship
Films directed by Martin McDonagh
Films featuring a Best Musical or Comedy Actor Golden Globe winning performance
Films impacted by the COVID-19 pandemic
Films produced by Graham Broadbent
Films scored by Carter Burwell
Films set in the 1920s
Films set in 1923
Films set in Ireland
Films set on fictional islands
Films shot in Ireland
Films whose writer won the Best Original Screenplay BAFTA Award
Irish Civil War films
Searchlight Pictures films
Tragicomedy films
2020s American films
2020s British films
2022 independent films
TSG Entertainment films
English-language Irish films